Diiriye  may refer to:

 Diriye Osman, Somali-British writer
 Abdillahi Diiriye Guled, Somali scholar
   Diiriye Guure, king of the Darawiish sultanate
Asha Gelle Dirie, activist for Puntite and Puntland women
Waris Dirie, Somali model and author

See also
Khair (disambiguation)